The Mystic Masseur is a 2001 Merchant Ivory film based on the novel of the same name by V. S. Naipaul. 
It is one of relatively few films directed by Ismail Merchant, who is better known as the producer in the Merchant Ivory partnership, and addresses issues of Hindu subculture in Trinidad and Tobago.

The movie was the first film adaptation of a novel by Naipaul. It was filmed in Trinidad and Tobago and was released in 2001, to lukewarm response. The screenplay is by Caryl Phillips. The film features performances by Om Puri and Aasif Mandvi, and original music by Zakir Hussain.

Synopsis
The novel by V. S. Naipaul moves between farce and acerbic social commentary on Trinidad, the country of his birth. The characters are mainly members of Trinidad's Indian community. The protagonist is Ganesh Ramsumair, a frustrated writer who rises from poverty on the back of his dubious talent as a "mystic" masseur, known as Pundit Ganesh, who can cure illnesses. In the end he becomes a successful colonial politician, under the name G. Ramsay Muir.

Cast
Om Puri as Ramlogan
Aasif Mandvi as Ganesh Ramsumair
Ayesha Dharker as Leela G. Ramsumair
Jimi Mistry as Pratap Cooper
Sanjeev Bhaskar as Beharry
Zohra Sehgal as Auntie 
Sakina Jaffrey as Suruj Mooma
Rez Kempton as Basdeo
Pip Torrens as Governor
Albert Laveau as Headmaster
Grace Maharaj as Mrs Cooper
James Fox as Mr Stewart
Rajendra D. as Mrs Cooper's Assistant and Man carrying cup of juice.
Michael Cherrie as Man in yellow suit
Maureen Thompson as Woman in rainbow dress
Dinesh Maharaj as a Taxi driver
Danesh Khan as Young Pratap Cooper

External links

Review by Slant Magazine
Merchant Ivory Production Listing
Review by BBC
Roger Ebert's review

2001 films
2001 drama films
British Indian films
Films about Indian Americans
English-language Indian films
Films directed by Ismail Merchant
Films set in Trinidad and Tobago
Merchant Ivory Productions films